The 2007 Bukit Gantang bus crash was the worst road accident in Malaysian history before the 2010 Cameron Highlands bus crash and 2013 Genting Highlands bus crash which claimed 27 and 37 lives respectively. Twenty passengers of the Super Express bus were killed in the accident which took place near Bukit Berapit, Bukit Gantang, Changkat Jering, Perak. It occurred on 13 August 2007 at 4.40 am, when the bus driver, Rohizan Abu Bakar, lost control of the bus as it was going down an incline and it crashed into a ditch at the 229th kilometre of the North–South Expressway.

Bakar, 38, died, along with 19 passengers. Police disclosed that the driver had two arrest warrants and 13 summonses against him, and his driving record was a factor being investigated in trying to determine the cause of the crash.

Sources

 Bus of death
 New Straits Times (Malaysia)
 Malaysian National News Agency
 International Herald Tribune

Bus incidents in Malaysia
Bukit Gantang bus crash
Bukit Gantang Bus Crash, 2007
August 2007 events in Asia